Kranj railway station is the railway station in Kranj, the third largest municipality and fourth largest city in Slovenia. The station is located on the railway line between Ljubljana, the capital city of Slovenia, and Villach, Austria.

External links 

Official site of the Slovenian railways 

Railway stations in Slovenia